Kathryn Elaine Jeffery is an American college administrator. She is the president of Santa Monica College.

Education 
Jeffery earned a bachelor of music education with a major in piano and a minor in voice from Oklahoma State University (OSU). She also completed a master of science in applied behavioral studies in education (counseling) from OSU. She earned a doctor of philosophy in educational administration with an emphasis in community college leadership from University of Texas at Austin. Her doctoral advisor was William Moore Jr.

Career 
Jeffery was the chief executive officer of Sacramento City College and Hennepin Technical College. She was the provost and chief campus administrator of College of Southern Nevada and the vice president of Columbia College. Jeffery was the dean for faculty and staff diversity and development and the dean for student services in the chancellor's office of California Community Colleges System. In February 2016, she became the president and superintendent of Santa Monica College. She is a member of the president's round table of African American CEOs.

See also 

 List of women presidents or chancellors of co-ed colleges and universities

References 

Living people
Year of birth missing (living people)
Santa Monica College faculty
Oklahoma State University alumni
University of Texas at Austin College of Education alumni
Sacramento City College
College of Southern Nevada
African-American academics
Heads of universities and colleges in the United States
20th-century African-American people
21st-century African-American people
African-American women academics
American women academics
20th-century African-American women
21st-century American women
Women heads of universities and colleges
20th-century American people
21st-century African-American women
African-American women academic administrators